Ivan Majeský (born 2 September 1976) is a Slovak former ice hockey defenceman.

Playing career 
Majeský was drafted by the Florida Panthers 267th overall in the 2001 NHL Entry Draft and played a full season with the Panthers scoring 4 goals and 8 assists for 12 points. On 21 June 2003, Majeský was traded to the Atlanta Thrashers for a Round 2 pick (Kamil Kreps), where he scored 3 goals and 7 assists for 10 points in 63 regular season games for Atlanta. During the 2004–05 NHL lockout, which resulted in the cancellation of the 2004–05 NHL season, Majeský played in the Czech Republic for HC Sparta Praha before joining the Washington Capitals. It's with the Capitals where Majeský is famous with North American fans for his only goal for the team, a 170–foot shot from his own end that somehow managed to bounce past Pittsburgh Penguins goalie Sébastien Caron. Before his NHL career began, Majeský played in Finland for Ilves.

On 22 September 2006, Linköpings HC announced that Majeský signed a contract lasting season 2006–07 with the Swedish club. Until mid-October he played for Kärpät in the Finnish SM-liiga before coming to Sweden.

On 3 July 2009, Majeský signed with Skellefteå AIK on loan.

In December 2011, Majeský re-signed with Linköpings HC.

Career statistics

Regular season and playoffs

International

References

External links 

 Ivan Majeský at the Washington Capitals page

1976 births
Living people
Atlanta Thrashers players
Florida Panthers draft picks
Florida Panthers players
HC '05 Banská Bystrica players
Rytíři Kladno players
HC Olomouc players
HC Sparta Praha players
HKM Zvolen players
HIFK (ice hockey) players
Ice hockey players at the 2002 Winter Olympics
Ice hockey players at the 2006 Winter Olympics
Jokerit players
Ilves players
Linköping HC players
Olympic ice hockey players of Slovakia
Oulun Kärpät players
Sportspeople from Banská Bystrica
Skellefteå AIK players
Slovak ice hockey defencemen
Washington Capitals players
Slovak expatriate ice hockey players in the United States
Slovak expatriate ice hockey players in Finland
Slovak expatriate ice hockey players in Sweden
Slovak expatriate ice hockey players in the Czech Republic